Mattel163 Limited is a joint venture between the American toys manufacturer Mattel and the Chinese Internet company NetEase (composed in equal parts), aimed for development an publishing online video games based on the Mattel's intellectual property. Its headquarters are located in both Sheung Wan, Hong Kong and El Segundo, California. The "163" in the name refers to the NetEase's domain, 163.com.

The first product published was UNO!, originally launched for Facebook Instant Games in 2017, and launched later on iOS and Android.

History 
At near end of 2017, Mattel and NetEase partnered to create a new development studio. Mattel163 CEO Amy Huang-Lee says:

Video games published 

 UNO!, based on the Uno card game

 Phase 10, based on the Rummy card game

 Skip-Bo, based on the Spite and Malice card game

References 

Mattel subsidiaries
NetEase
Video game companies of China
Video game publishers